Avarolli is a village in Belgaum district in the southern state of Karnataka, India.

Avarolli village is in the Khanapur Taluk of Belgaum District. Khanapur, Belgaum, Bylahongal, and Supa, are the towns close to Avarolli. Avarolli is reachable by Khanapur Railway Station, Idalhond Railway Station, Gunji Railway Station or, Desur RailWay Station. It is the main village in Avarolli Panchayat.

References

Villages in Belagavi district